The Grand Fleet was the main battlefleet of the Royal Navy during the First World War. It was established in August 1914 and disbanded in April 1919. Its main base was Scapa Flow in the Orkney Islands.

History

Formed in August 1914 from the First Fleet and part of the Second Fleet of the Home Fleets, the Grand Fleet included 25–35 modern capital ships.  It was commanded initially by Admiral Sir John Jellicoe.

The 10th Cruiser Squadron carried out the Northern Patrol between Shetland and Norway and cruisers from Cromarty and Rosyth operated a second line (and screened the fleet) in enforcing the blockade of Germany. The administrative complications of the distant blockade across the northern exits of the North Sea overwhelmed the capacity of Vice Admiral Francis Miller, the Base Admiral in Chief from 7 August 1914, devolving on the commander in chief, Admiral John Jellicoe. To relieve the administrative burdens on Miller and Jellicoe, the post of the Admiral of the Orkneys and Shetlands was created to oversee the defence of the islands, naval bases and shore duties.  Vice-Admiral Stanley Colville was appointed to the command (7 September 1914 – 19 January 1916) with Miller under his authority.

Admiral Jellicoe was significantly concerned about the possibility of submarine or destroyer attacks on Scapa Flow. While the Grand Fleet spent almost the first year of the war patrolling the west coast of the British Isles, their base at Scapa was defensively reinforced, beginning with over sixty blockships sunk in the many entrance channels between the southern islands to enable the use of submarine nets and booms. These blocked approaches were backed by minefields, artillery and concrete barriers.

Admiral Jellicoe was succeeded by Admiral Sir David Beatty in December 1916.

The Grand Fleet was based first at Scapa Flow in the Orkney Islands, and later at Rosyth on the Firth of Forth. It participated with the biggest fleet action of the war – the Battle of Jutland – in June 1916.

After the Battle of Jutland, the German High Seas Fleet rarely ventured out of its bases at Wilhelmshaven and Kiel in the last two years of the war to engage with the British fleet.

Following the German defeat, 74 ships of the High Seas Fleet of the Imperial German Navy  were interned in Gutter Sound at Scapa Flow pending a decision on their future in the peace Treaty of Versailles.

During April 1919 the Grand Fleet was disbanded, with much of its strength forming a new Atlantic Fleet.

Most of the interned German warships were later scuttled despite Royal Navy attempts to save them.

Order of battle

Not all the Grand Fleet was available for use at any one time, because ships required maintenance and repairs. At the time of the Battle of Jutland in May 1916, it had 32 dreadnought and super-dreadnought battleships. Of these, 28 were in the order of battle at Jutland.

The actual strength of the fleet varied through the war as new ships were built and others were transferred or sunk but the number of battleships steadily increased, adding to the margin of superiority over the German fleet. After the USA joined the war, the US Battleship Division Nine was attached to the Grand Fleet as the Sixth Battle Squadron, adding four, later five, dreadnought battleships.

The order of battle of the Grand Fleet at the end of the war in 1918 included 35 dreadnought battleships and 11 battlecruisers. Twenty ships had been completed since the outbreak of war. Five of these ships were from the United States Navy and one  from the Royal Australian Navy. It had five battle squadrons, each of four to ten capital ships, plus the flagship HMS Queen Elizabeth, three cruiser squadrons, the "Flying Squadron" of seaplane carriers, and six destroyer flotillas, with another destroyer flotilla and three minesweeper flotillas under its command. The Battle Cruiser Force was two battle squadrons and the flagship  (9 ships in total), and five cruiser squadrons (21 ships).

Notes

References

Sources

External links
 The Grand Fleet
 Royal Navy History

Fleets of the Royal Navy
1914 establishments in the United Kingdom
Military units and formations disestablished in 1919
Military units and formations established in 1914
Military units and formations of the Royal Navy in World War I